Carrigtwohill railway station serves the town of Carrigtwohill in County Cork.

It is a station on the Cork to Midleton commuter service. Passengers to Cobh change at Glounthaune station.

The station is unstaffed but has a ticket vending machine. Its two platforms are both fully accessible.

History
The original station in Carrigtwohill was opened on 2 November 1859, but closed for goods traffic on 2 December 1974 and fully closed on 6 September 1976. It was re-opened on 30 July 2009 as part of the newly refurbished Cork-Midleton line.

Developments
'Carrigtwohill West' station was proposed to serve an industrial area west of Carrigtwohill, with IDA Ireland providing partial funding. The project was cancelled in 2012.

See also
 List of railway stations in Ireland

References

External links
Irish Rail Carrigtwohill Station Website

Iarnród Éireann stations in County Cork
Railway stations in County Cork
Railway stations opened in 1859
1859 establishments in Ireland
Railway stations closed in 1976
Railway stations opened in 2009
Railway stations in the Republic of Ireland opened in the 19th century